Heikant is a hamlet in the municipality of Laarbeek, in the Dutch province of North Brabant. It is located about 3 km east of Aarle-Rixtel.

Heikant has a population of about 295; this includes a large part of the surrounding countryside. Heikant has no place name signs, but there is a golf course.

References

Populated places in North Brabant
Laarbeek